"4 Da Gang" is a song by American rappers 42 Dugg and Roddy Ricch. It was released on April 2, 2021, by 4 Pockets Full (4PF), Collective Music Group (CMG) and Interscope Records, as the fourth single from the former's fourth mixtape, Free Dem Boyz. The song was produced by TayTayMadeIt, and samples "No One Like You" by German rock band Scorpions.

Background
Prior to the release of the song, a shooting occurred during the filming of the music video, leaving three people wounded. Neither of the rappers were harmed, and rapper OMB Peezy was later arrested for his connection to the shooting.

Composition
The song features heavy guitar production, as well as trap drums in its instrumental. It sees 42 Dugg and Roddy Ricch rhyming about their lavish lives, such as cars and women, as well as their loyalty to their crews.

Music video
The music video was released on April 29, 2021. It opens with Roddy Ricch being interrogated by police about 42 Dugg's whereabouts. When he refuses to give information, the agents go on a manhunt, but Dugg, who is hiding in a trailer at a junkyard, arranges for "redneck denizens" to ambush them and trap them in the trunk of their own car. Dugg and Ricch are also seen rapping in front of a burning Confederate flag.

Charts

Weekly charts

Year-end charts

Certifications

References

2021 songs
2021 singles
42 Dugg songs
Roddy Ricch songs
Songs written by Roddy Ricch
Songs written by Rudolf Schenker
Songs written by Klaus Meine
Songs written by 42 Dugg
Rap rock songs
Collective Music Group singles
Interscope Records singles